Balls is the third major-label album of country music singer Elizabeth Cook.  It was released May 1, 2007, on 31 Tigers Records. The album includes the single "Sometimes It Takes Balls to Be a Woman", which did not chart. The title track was however nominated for Song of the Year at the 2007 Americana Music Awards.

Track listing
All songs written by Elizabeth Cook except where noted.
"Times Are Tough in Rock 'N Roll" - 2:05
"Don't Go Borrowing Trouble" - 2:46
"Sometimes It Takes Balls to Be a Woman" (Cook, Melinda Schneider) - 3:17
"Rest Your Weary Mind" (Cook, Melinda Schneider) - 3:19
"He Got No Heart" - 2:11
"Mama's Prayers" - 3:11
"Sunday Morning" (John Cale, Lou Reed) - 3:12
"What Do I Do"  - 2:39
"Down Girl" - 3:11
"Gonna Be" (Cook, Tim Carroll) - 2:03
"Always Tomorrow" - 5:02

Personnel
 Bobby Bare Jr. - background vocals on "Rest Your Weary Mind"
 Richard Bennett - acoustic guitar, electric guitar
 Tim Carroll - acoustic guitar, electric guitar, juice harp
 Matt Combs - fiddle, mandolin
 Elizabeth Cook - lead vocals
 Rodney Crowell - acoustic guitar, background vocals
 Greg Davis - banjo
 Nanci Griffith - background vocals
 Tim Lauer - organ, piano
 Alison Prestwood - bass guitar
 Maria Ramirez - background vocals
 Michael Rhodes - bass guitar
 Harry Stinson - drums
 Kenny Vaughan - electric guitar

Chart performance

External links

2007 albums
Elizabeth Cook albums
Albums produced by Rodney Crowell